These are the results and statistics for the Australian Lacrosse League season of 2005.

Game 8
Friday, 21 October 2005, Adelaide, South Australia

Goalscorers:
SA: A Lawman 5, L Perham 3–2, M Mangan 2, S Connolly 1, S Robb 1, P Inge 0–2, A Feleppa 0–1, S Gilbert 0–1, R Stone 0–1.
WA: D Whiteman 3, R Brown 2–1, K Delfs 2–1, A Sear 2–1, W Curran 2, L Blackie 1-1, J Stack 1, G Allan 0–1.

Game 9
Saturday, 22 October 2005, Adelaide, South Australia

Goalscorers:
SA: A Lawman 3, M Mangan 3, L Perham 2–1, C Averay 1-1, S Robb 0–2, J Casagrande 0–1.
WA: G Allan 3–1, D Whiteman 3, R Brown 2–1, K Delfs 2–1, A Sear 2, J Stack 1-1, L Blackie 1, W Curran 1, knocked-in 1.

Game 10
Saturday, 29 October 2005, Perth, Western Australia

Goalscorers:
WA: W Curran 2, A Sear 2, K Gillespie 1, D Whiteman 1, B Smith 0–1.
Vic: J Buchanan 3–1, D Nicholas 3, T Fry 1, B Ross 1, R Stark 1, D Stiglich 1, D Pusvacietis 0–1, M Sevior 0–1.

Game 11
Sunday, 30 October 2005, Perth, Western Australia

Goalscorers:
WA: D Whiteman 2–1, J Stack 1-1, G Allan 1, R Brown 1, K Gillespie 1, A Sear 1, L Blackie 0–1.
Vic: B Ross 5–3, D Pusvacietis 3-3, J Buchanan 2-2, D Stiglich 2-2, R Stark 2, N Stiglich 2, D Nicholas 1–2, R Garnsworthy 1, M McInerney 0–1.

Game 12
Friday, 4 November 2005, Melbourne, Victoria

Goalscorers:
Vic: B Ross 2, M Sevior 2, R Stark 2, D Pusvacietis 1–2, D Stiglich 1, N Stiglich 1, J Ardossi 0–1.
SA: A Feleppa 3, S Robb 1-1, A Lawman 1, M Mangan 1, S Gilbert 0–1.

Game 13
Saturday, 5 November 2005, Melbourne, Victoria

Goalscorers:
Vic: J Buchanan 3, J Ardossi 2–1, R Stark 2–1, N Stiglich 2–1, T Fry 2, D Arnell 1, D Pusvacietis 1, M McInerney 0–1.
SA: M Mangan 2–1, S Robb 2, S Connolly 2, L Perham 1-1, A Carter 1, A Feleppa 0–1.

ALL Table 2005
Table after completion of round-robin tournament

FINAL (Game 14)
Friday, 11 November 2005, Adelaide, South Australia

Goalscorers:
Vic: R Stark 3, D Stiglich 3, J Buchanan 2-2, R Garnsworthy 2–1, D Pusvacietis 2–1, J Ardossi 2, D Nicholas 1–3, T Fry 1, J Tokarua 1, N Stiglich 0–2.
WA: W Curran 2, R Brown 1–2, G Allan 1, B Smith 1, D Whiteman 1.

All-Stars
 ALL 2005 Champions: Victoria
 ALL 2005 Most Valuable Player: Peter Inge (SA)
 ALL 2005 All-Stars: Jamie Buchanan, Sam Marquard, Brad Ross, Robbie Stark, Daniel Stiglich, John Tokarua (Vic), Warren Brown, Wayne Curran, Gavin Leavy, Glenn Morley, David Whiteman (WA), Peter Inge (SA). Coach: David Joy (Vic). Referee: ...

See also
Lacrosse
Australian Lacrosse League
Lacrosse in Australia

External links
 Australian Lacrosse League
 Lacrosse Australia
 Lacrosse South Australia
 Lacrosse Victoria
 Western Australian Lacrosse Association

Australian Lacrosse League
2005 in Australian sport
2005 in lacrosse